William Francis Dalton (1888-1956) was a pioneer rugby league footballer in the New South Wales Rugby League in the 1911–12 and 1914 seasons.

Playing career
Dalton, a Lock and Paddington Junior, played for the Eastern Suburbs club the year that club won its first premiership in 1911, he was also a member of their second premiership side in 1912.

He finished his career at Glebe in 1914.

Dalton is recognised as being the Sydney Roosters club's 58th player.

His brother, Barney Dalton, also played with Eastern Suburbs.

References

External links
 

1888 births
1956 deaths
Australian rugby league players
Glebe rugby league players
Rugby league players from Sydney
Sydney Roosters players